Bassac is a commune in the Charente department in southwestern France. It has Bassac Abbey, founded more than 1000 years ago (in the year 1002), partially restored in the late 20th century, and sold in 2015 to a trust ("société civile immobilièree") for renovation.

Population

See also
Communes of the Charente department

References

Communes of Charente